Gastón Martínez Menéndez (born 1 December 1989) is a Uruguayan professional footballer who plays as a midfielder for Sud América.

Career
Martínez started his career with El Tanque Sisley. He scored on his professional debut, netting in a 2–1 victory in the Uruguayan Primera División over River Plate on 7 May 2011; another goal followed three weeks later against Miramar Misiones. In total, he featured ninety-three times in all competitions during three years with El Tanque Sisley. Martínez had a seven-month stint with Cerro, prior to joining fellow Primera División side Rentistas in July 2015. Twenty-three appearances followed across the 2015–16 season, which ended with relegation to the Uruguayan Segunda División. On 28 February 2017, Martínez rejoined El Tanque Sisley.

After nineteen appearances in the top-flight for El Tanque Sisley, Martínez departed to complete a move to Sud América in February 2018. Manager Gustavo Bueno selected the midfielder twenty-five times in his debut campaign with the club.

Career statistics
.

References

External links

1989 births
Living people
Footballers from Montevideo
Uruguayan footballers
Association football midfielders
Uruguayan Primera División players
Uruguayan Segunda División players
El Tanque Sisley players
C.A. Cerro players
C.A. Rentistas players
Sud América players